is a Japanese voice actress from Tokyo, Japan and is employed by Aoni Production.

Filmography

Anime
Bomberman B-Daman Bakugaiden
Green Green
Guruguru Town Hanamaru-kun
Hikaru no Go
Madeline

Games
Bloody Roar 3 - Uranus
Bloody Roar 4 - Uranus
Green Green
Tales of Destiny
Tekken 4 - Miharu Hirano
Xenosaga Episode I: Der Wille zur Macht - Lapis Roman

CDs
One: Kagayaku Kisetsu e

References
 2022

External links
Eriko Fujimaki's profile at Aoni's website 
 

1974 births
Voice actresses from Tokyo
Japanese video game actresses
Japanese voice actresses
Living people
20th-century Japanese actresses
21st-century Japanese actresses
Aoni Production voice actors